Tiffany Evans is the self-titled debut album by R&B singer Tiffany Evans. It was released by Columbia Records on April 22, 2008, in the United States and on August 27, 2008, in Japan with two bonus tracks (see 2008 in music). The first single was "Promise Ring", which features Ciara and is Evans' most successful single to date. The second was "I'm Grown", which features Bow Wow. The album was executive produced by Ciara and The Clutch. Album peaked at number 134 on US Billboard 200.

Critical reception

Both DJBooth.net and AllMusic gave album four out of five stars. AllMusic wrote saying: "In hopes on striking gold with the current pop market, Evans isn't presented as the next Mariah Carey. Rather, she is showcased as a more talented Ciara, toning down on the dance tracks but keeping the beat up the whole way through. With guest appearances by Bow Wow and Ciara herself, Evans keeps the vibe on the album vibrant and sassy, while never truly crossing over to inappropriate. Even on the heavier tracks, Evans never gets lost in the music. Her voice sails over the beats and cuts, thus truly synthesizing the best of both worlds. More than a handful of the tracks show the playfulness of Lil' Mama, the mainstream appeal of Miley Cyrus, and Beyoncé's soulful voice, which propels Evans to a pop sound that is truly refreshing. The music is highly accessible; most of the tracks are prepared for radio airplay, and highlights like "Thinkin' About" and "Favorite Broken Heart" are never short on presenting Evans as not only a vocalist but as an artist with mounds of potential who, if she can keep herself moldable and flexible, could see a long career ahead of her."

Singles
 "Promise Ring" was released as the main single from the album on 29 May 2007. Track featured a guest appearance by singer Ciara. Single peaked at number one on US Billboard's Bubbling Under Hot 100 and it's the most successful single by Evans to date.
 "I'm Grown" was released as second and final single on 12 January 2008. It featured a guest appearance by rapper Bow Wow. It peaked at number 99 at Hot R&B/Hip-Hop Songs chart.
 Third single "Lay Back & Chill" was planned but wasn't released. Instead of release of that single, Evans started working on her second album.

Track listing

Notes
 denotes vocal producer
 denotes co-producer

Charts

Release history

References

External links
 Official website

2008 debut albums
Albums produced by Eric Hudson
Albums produced by Hit-Boy
Albums produced by Rodney Jerkins
Albums produced by Mr. Collipark
Albums produced by RedOne
Tiffany Evans albums